Windsor Township is one of the twenty-seven townships of Ashtabula County, Ohio, United States. The 2010 census found 2,279 people in the township.

Geography
Located in the southwestern corner of the county, it borders the following townships:
Hartsgrove Township - north
Rome Township - northeast corner
Orwell Township - east
Bloomfield Township, Trumbull County - southeast corner
Mesopotamia Township, Trumbull County - south
Middlefield Township, Geauga County - southwest corner
Huntsburg Township, Geauga County - west
Montville Township, Geauga County - northwest corner

No municipalities are located in Windsor Township, although the unincorporated community of Windsor lies in the township's east.

Name and history

Statewide, other Windsor Townships are located in Lawrence and Morgan counties.

The earliest settler in Windsor Township was George Phelps, who came to the area from Connecticut in 1799.

Government
The township is governed by a three-member board of trustees, who are elected in November of odd-numbered years to a four-year term beginning on the following January 1. Two are elected in the year after the presidential election and one is elected in the year before it. There is also an elected township fiscal officer, who serves a four-year term beginning on April 1 of the year after the election, which is held in November of the year before the presidential election. Vacancies in the fiscal officership or on the board of trustees are filled by the remaining trustees.  Currently, the board is composed of chairman Jeffrey Merritt and members Bonnie Plizga and Robert Slusher.

References

External links
County website
Windsor Township Website

Townships in Ashtabula County, Ohio
Townships in Ohio